Yangi-Kyuch (Yañı Kös) is a rural locality (a village) in Malinovsky Selsoviet, Belebeyevsky District, Bashkortostan, Russia. The population was 14 as of 2010. There is 1 street.

Geography 
Yangi-Kyuch is located 15 km southwest of Belebey (the district's administrative centre) by road. Serdyuki is the nearest rural locality.

References 

Rural localities in Belebeyevsky District